The House of Flowers: The Movie is a 2021 Mexican comedy-drama film directed by Manolo Caro. The film was announced in April 2021 and is a sequel of the series of the same name. The film premiered on Netflix on June 23, 2021.

Synopsis
Florist Delia, a confidant of the de la Mora family, requests from her deathbed that Paulina de la Mora find evidence in the old family home in order to have proof against Agustín Corcuera for the murder of Paulina's father, Pato. The de la Mora siblings and associates are reunited to try and retrieve it, but have to devise a plan when the new occupant won't entertain them. In a concurrent storyline set in 1987, Paulina's mother, Virginia, and her friends gather the evidence and hide it.

Cast 

Sources:

Production
The film, serving as a spin-off to Mexican breakout series The House of Flowers, was announced on April 23, 2021, by creators Netflix on the Mexican leg of their production slate road trip. Variety suggested that the movie's announcement was an appeasement to the fans of the original series, as there had been disappointment that it only ran for three seasons.

References

External links 

 
 

2021 comedy-drama films
2021 films
Mexican comedy-drama films
2020s Spanish-language films
Spanish-language Netflix original films
The House of Flowers (TV series)
2020s Mexican films